The Calcination of Scout Niblett is the fifth studio album by singer-songwriter Scout Niblett, and was her first release on Drag City records. The album was Niblett's fourth collaboration with producer Steve Albini.

Track listing

Personnel
Scout Niblett - vocals, guitar, drums

Technical personnel 
Steve Albini - engineer
Dylan Long - photography (cover art)

References

2010 albums
Scout Niblett albums
Albums produced by Steve Albini